The Ārai Terraces are a series of crevassed terraces and icefalls close southward of Fazekas Hills, near the head of Lowery Glacier. They were so named by the New Zealand Geological Survey Antarctic Expedition (1959–60) because they are a natural barrier to sledge travel which the party was unable to traverse, ārai being the Māori term for barrier.

References
 

Crevasse fields of the Ross Dependency

Icefalls of the Ross Dependency
Shackleton Coast
Landforms of the Ross Dependency